In computing, the Java Cryptography Architecture (JCA) is a framework for working with cryptography using the Java programming language. It forms part of the Java security  API, and was first introduced in JDK 1.1 in the  package.

The JCA uses a "provider"-based architecture and contains a set of APIs for various purposes, such as encryption, key generation and management, secure random-number generation, certificate validation, etc. These APIs provide an easy way for  developers to integrate security into application code.

See also
Java Cryptography Extension
Bouncy Castle (cryptography)

External links
 Official JCA guides: JavaSE6, JavaSE7, JavaSE8, JavaSE9, JavaSE10, JavaSE11

Java platform
Cryptographic software